The Casey Jr. Splash 'n' Soak Station is an attraction in the Fantasyland section of Walt Disney World in Bay Lake, Florida.

Attraction
Casey Jr is the train seen in the film Dumbo, where Dumbo, his mother, Mrs. Jumbo, and other circus animals travel on to the shows. This attraction is a water play area across from the Dumbo the Flying Elephant ride and The Barnstormer starring the Great Goofini. It is designed to look like it has actual animals in the train by having elephant trunks and giraffes that spray out water at young guests.

Status
Over the years, the water attraction began to have its paint peeling off and some of the water effects stop functioning. As a result, the attraction was temporarily closed on February 11, 2019, for some cleaning, repainting, and refurbishment.

See also
Casey Jr. Circus Train

References

External link
Official website

Amusement rides introduced in 2012
Dumbo
Walt Disney Parks and Resorts attractions
Magic Kingdom
Fantasyland
2012 establishments in Florida
Fictional locomotives